Buzhdym is a rural locality (a settlement) in Maratovskoye Rural Settlement, Kochyovsky District, Perm Krai, Russia. The population was 199 as of 2010. There are 5 streets.

Geography 
Buzhdym is located 44 km east of Kochyovo (the district's administrative centre) by road. Maraty is the nearest rural locality.

References 

Rural localities in Kochyovsky District